Microcolpia is a genus of gastropods belonging to the family Melanopsidae.

The species of this genus are found in South Europe.

Species:

Microcolpia canaliculata 
Microcolpia coutagniana 
Microcolpia daudebartii 
Microcolpia friedeli 
Microcolpia gallandi 
Microcolpia glinaica 
Microcolpia hagenmuelleriana 
Microcolpia inconspicua 
Microcolpia letourneuxi 
Microcolpia longa 
Microcolpia mabilliana 
Microcolpia pachystoma 
Microcolpia parreyssii 
Microcolpia peracuta 
Microcolpia pyramidalis 
Microcolpia rara 
Microcolpia rochebruniana 
Microcolpia schileykoi 
Microcolpia servaini 
Microcolpia stossichiana 
Microcolpia ucrainica 
Microcolpia wuesti

References

Melanopsidae